Jaramana Sports Club is a Syrian football club based in Jaramana. It was founded in 1979. They play their home games at the Municipal Stadium (also known as "Raed Munir Al-Atrash Stadium").

References

Jaramana
Association football clubs established in 1979
1979 establishments in Syria